The Israel national ice hockey team is the national men's ice hockey team of Israel. Since 2015, the team's Captain has been Eliezer Sherbatov. Israel was ranked 35th as of May 2017 by the International Ice Hockey Federation. In 2019, the team won the gold medal in the 2019 IIHF World Championship Division II Group B tournament in Mexico City.

Its greatest achievement in its history was winning its division II group in 2005 and being promoted to division I for the first, and thus far only, time. Israel was relegated back to division II a year later.

Ranking

World Championships record
Eliezer Sherbatov drew international attention when he first played in the 2005 IIHF World U18 Championship Division III, in Bulgaria, at the age of 13, becoming the youngest player to step on the ice in an under-18 ice hockey world championship. He scored 9 points (4 goals + 5 assists) in 5 games, as the team won a bronze medal, Israel's first in hockey in a championship tournament.

The team was promoted to the IIHF World Championship Division I in 2005 Men's World Ice Hockey Championships. The following year the team was relegated again to Division II. In 2010, Israel was relegated to Division III.

However, in 2011 the team finished first in Division III Group B, earning a promotion back to Division II. Israel won all five of its games by a combined score of 57–9, and was promoted to the IIHF Division II WHC to be played in 2012.  Sherbatov led the tournament in points, goals, assists, and +/-, earning 26 points (14 goals + 12 assists) in just four games. He was named the best forward of the tournament.

At the 2012 IIHF World Championship Division II tournament in Bulgaria, the Israeli team was able to stay in the second division.  Beginning in 2015 and still as of 2020, Sherbatov was captain of the national team.

In 2019, the team won the gold medal in the 2019 IIHF World Championship Division II Group B tournament in Mexico City, Israel's first gold medal in hockey. With the win, the team qualified for the World Championships Division 2A. Sherbatov was named Best Forward, and had the best +/- rating, was the top goal scorer, and was the top scorer with 15 points (7 goals + 8 assists) in 5 games.

Olympics
Israel has tried to qualify for the Olympics three times. In 1996 they advanced past Greece, and were eliminated by Yugoslavia before the main qualification rounds, in trying to advance to the 1998 Olympics.

For the 2014 Winter Olympics, Israel attempted to qualify, going 0–3 in the pre-qualifier.

For the 2018 Winter Olympics, Israel again attempted to qualify. However, they were unable to, going 1–2 in the pre-qualifier.

Team

Roster
Roster for the 2022 IIHF World Championship.

Notable players
Maxim Birbraer (only Israeli to be drafted by NHL team)
Alon Eizenman (ACHA Hall of Fame member)
Oren Eizenman (played 4 seasons in AHL)
Eliezer Sherbatov (first Israeli to play in KHL)

Coaches

All-time record against other nations
As of 30 April 2022

References

External links

IIHF profile

 
Ice hockey teams in Israel
National ice hockey teams in Asia